Rick Wilson (born January 31, 1953) is a former NASCAR Winston Cup driver. He began racing in 1980, and posted 23 top-ten finishes over his career. NASCAR's website says that he is probably best known for his "close, side-by-side second to Bill Elliott in Daytona's summer event in 1988." He was also known for taking over Richard Petty's car at Petty Enterprises after Petty retired in a car numbered 44.

Career

Wilson's most successful run came from 1986 until 1989, driving the No. 4 car for Morgan-McClure Motorsports, when he was a consistent top-20 driver and won his only pole position, at Bristol Motor Speedway. Wilson also famously narrowly lost the 1988 Pepsi 400 to Bill Elliott, which was the best finish, at the time, for MMM. In 1990, he drove for RahMoc Enterprises and followed that up with a year with Stavola Brothers Racing.  Following the 1992 Daytona 500, he was fired from his ride with the Stavola Brothers.  Wilson was tabbed by Richard Petty to replace him at Petty Enterprises following the 1992 season. Wilson also raced several years in the Busch Series driving for the Abingdon-based Food Country No. 75 Oldsmobile operated by Henderson Motorsports. He won two races, Bristol, and Dover, both in 1989. The Bristol race he won was postponed due to snow, and ran on a Monday. Wilson led 161 of the 200 laps ran on his way to victory.  Wilson started second in 1989 at Martinsville, leading 160 of the 200 laps before blowing a motor and finishing 21st. Wilson has not raced in NASCAR since 1998. 

Wilson won the Scotts EZ Seed Showdown in 2010; a race against other retired NASCAR drivers. He returned to active competition for a single race in the USARacing Pro Cup Series at Bristol later that year, finishing 19th following an accident.

Personal life
Rick continues to live on his family’s cattle ranch and work as a business owner in his home of Bartow, Florida. He is married to wife, Teresa and has three children Erin, Travis and Lori Ann.  Rick was elected to the Polk County Commission on August 28, 2018 after soundly beating his opponent, Kathryn Gates-Skipper, by an almost 2 to 1 vote. His elected term was to begin on November 20, 2018.  However, Wilson was appointed by Florida Governor Rick Scott to begin serving early when the sitting commissioner resigned and was sworn in on October 2, 2018.

Motorsports career results

NASCAR
(key) (Bold – Pole position awarded by qualifying time. Italics – Pole position earned by points standings or practice time. * – Most laps led.)

Winston Cup Series

Daytona 500

Busch Series

Craftsman Truck Series

ARCA Permatex SuperCar Series
(key) (Bold – Pole position awarded by qualifying time. Italics – Pole position earned by points standings or practice time. * – Most laps led.)

References

External links
 

Living people
1953 births
Sportspeople from Bartow, Florida
Racing drivers from Florida
NASCAR drivers
CARS Tour drivers
NASCAR team owners
Farmers from Florida
American Speed Association drivers
21st-century American politicians
County commissioners in Florida
Florida Republicans
American athlete-politicians